

Champions

Major League Baseball
World Series: Brooklyn Dodgers over New York Yankees (4-3); Johnny Podres, MVP
All-Star Game, July 12 at County Stadium: National League, 6-5 (12 innings)

Other champions
College World Series: Wake Forest University
Japan Series: Yomiuri Giants over Nankai Hawks (4-3)
Little League World Series: Morrisville, Pennsylvania
Pan American Games: Dominican Republic over USA
Winter Leagues
1955 Caribbean Series: Cangrejeros de Santurce
Cuban League: Alacranes del Almendares
Dominican Republic League: Leones del Escogido
Mexican Pacific League: Venados de Mazatlán
Panamanian League: Carta Vieja Yankees
Puerto Rican League: Cangrejeros de Santurce
Venezuelan League: Navegantes del Magallanes

Awards and honors
Baseball Hall of Fame
Frank Baker
Joe DiMaggio
Ted Lyons
Dazzy Vance
Gabby Hartnett
Ray Schalk
Most Valuable Player
American League: Yogi Berra, New York Yankees
National League: Roy Campanella, Brooklyn Dodgers
Rookie of the Year
American League: Herb Score, Cleveland Indians
National League: Bill Virdon, St. Louis Cardinals

MLB statistical leaders

Major league baseball final standings

American League final standings

National League final standings

Events
Before the Athletics arrive in town, the Kansas City Monarchs move their base of operations to Grand Rapids, Michigan. They retain the name "Kansas City Monarchs" and continue in the Negro American League as a barnstorming team.

January
January 24 – In an effort to speed up the game, Major League Baseball announces a new rule which requires a pitcher to deliver the ball within 20 seconds after taking a pitching position.

February
February 17 – - The Baltimore Orioles obtained pitcher Erv Palica from the Brooklyn Dodgers in exchange for first baseman Frank Kellert and cash considerations. This replaces the previous Preacher Roe deal, which fell through when the Brooklyn pitcher announced his retirement.
February 28 – The National League fines the Milwaukee Braves $500 for opening their spring training camp before the official March 1 date.

March
March 7 – Commissioner Ford Frick advocated for the return of the spitball, arguing that it is "a great pitch and one of the easiest to throw. There was nothing dangerous about it." The spitball was banned following the 1920 season. Despite the Commissioner's enthusiasm, the pitch remained illegal.

April
April 12 – After a big civic parade, the Athletics open their first season in Kansas City with a win over the Detroit Tigers, 6–2, before a crowd of 32,844.
April 14 – Elston Howard becomes the first African-American to wear the New York Yankees uniform. Howard singles in his first-at-bat, against the Boston Red Sox, as the Yankees win 8–4.
 April 23: The Chicago White Sox tallied a franchise record 29 runs and 29 hits against the host Kansas City Athletics, including seven home runs, in a 29–6 ripping. Sherm Lollar was 5-for-6 with a pair of home runs and five RBI, and became the only player in the decade to get two hits in one inning twice in the same game (2nd and 6th innings). Chico Carrasquel hit 5-for-6, and Bob Nieman paced the attack with two homers and seven RBI. Walt Dropo added a homer and seven RBI, while pitcher Jack Harshman and Minnie Miñoso also homered. Carrasquel and Miñoso each scored five runs. Kansas City had homers from Vic Power and Bill Renna. Bobby Shantz was the losing pitcher.

May
May 12 – Sam Jones of the Chicago Cubs no-hits the Pittsburgh Pirates, 4–0, becoming the first African American to pitch a no-hitter in the Major Leagues. In the ninth inning Jones walks the bases full and then strikes out Dick Groat, Roberto Clemente and Frank Thomas in a row to preserve his victory. It is also the first no-hitter at Wrigley Field in 38 years. Only 2,918 fans are on hand to witness the double milestone.
May 13 – At Yankee Stadium, Mickey Mantle hits home runs from both sides of the plate for the first time in his major league career. The New York Yankees slugger finishes the game with three home runs – two left-handed and one right-handed, while driving in all of his team's runs in a 5–2 victory over the Detroit Tigers. Whitey Ford is the winning pitcher and Steve Gromek takes the loss.

June
June 1 – Duke Snider hit three home runs at Ebbets Field, helping the Brooklyn Dodgers to an 11–8 victory over the Milwaukee Braves. Pee Wee Reese, Jackie Robinson and Roy Campanella also belted solo homers for the Dodgers, to set a franchise record with six home runs in a single game.

July
July 12 – In the All–Star Game in Milwaukee's County Stadium, the American League takes a five run lead on a three-run home run by Mickey Mantle off Robin Roberts, only to see the National League tie it. Milwaukee Braves pitcher Gene Conley strikes out the side in the 12th inning, and Stan Musial of the St. Louis Cardinals homers off Boston Red Sox pitcher Frank Sullivan to seal a 6–5 victory.
July 26 - In a key nighttime game at Yankee Stadium, the New York Yankees beat the Chicago White Sox 1–0. The game's only run occurred in the bottom of the 6th inning when Yogi Berra hit his 17th homer of the season off the White Sox' Dick Donovan. Tommy Byrne was the winning pitcher as he held the White Sox to just 4 hits, all of them singles.
July 31 – On the first anniversary of his four-home run game, Milwaukee Braves first baseman Joe Adcock has his arm broken by a pitch from the New York Giants' Jim Hearn. Adcock will miss the rest of the season.

August
August 20 – The Chicago White Sox rally to edge the Detroit Tigers‚ 8–7. Nellie Fox and Jim Rivera pace the attack with four hits apiece‚ while Chico Carrasquel adds a home run. George Kell drives in five runs for the White Sox. The win leaves Chicago (71-46) tied in second place with Cleveland (73-48)‚ and a game in back of New York (74-47).

September
September 8 – The Brooklyn Dodgers clinch the National League pennant by beating the Milwaukee Braves, 10–2, for their 8th NL title.
September 16 – The Kansas City Athletics score seven runs in the first inning and roll to a 13–7 win over the faltering Chicago White Sox. The third place Sox lose their 10th in 17 games. Héctor López hits a three-run home run in the first to start the scoring and later in the game Joe Astroth adds another three-run homer. George Kell and Chico Carrasquel hits solo homers for Chicago. In the 8th inning, 16-year-old shortstop Alex George debuts for Kansas City‚handling two chances in the field flawlessly and making out in his one at bat. George will go 1-for-10 in this his only Major League season.
September 14 – Cleveland Indians pitcher Herb Score breaks a rookie record of 235 strikeouts in a season set by Grover Cleveland Alexander in 1911. Score would finish the season with an American League-best 245 strikeouts, along with a 16–10 record and 2.86 earned run average, en route to the American League Rookie of the Year Award.

October
October 4 – No more "wait till' next year" as the Brooklyn Dodgers, behind the pitching of Johnny Podres, brings its first, and only, World Championship to Brooklyn after seven previous frustrated World Series appearances in a 2–0 win over the New York Yankees. The Dodgers win the Series four game to three, and Podres is named Most Valuable Player – the first time the award is given in the World Series.
October 25 – Chicago White Sox GM Frank Lane trade SS Chico Carrasquel and CF Jim Busby to the Cleveland Indians in exchange for CF Larry Doby. The trade was made by Lane to make room for Carrasquel's fellow Venezuelan and future Hall of Famer Luis Aparicio.

November
November 2 – The Pittsburgh Pirates name Bobby Bragan as their new field manager, replacing Fred Haney.
November 8 – In a nine-player transaction before the 1956 season, the Washington Senators sent All-Stars Bob Porterfield and Mickey Vernon along with Johnny Schmitz and Tom Umphlett to the Boston Red Sox, in exchange for Dick Brodowski, Neil Chrisley, Tex Clevenger, Karl Olson and Minor leaguer Al Curtis.
November 12 – Fred Hutchinson replaces Harry Walker as the St. Louis Cardinals manager. With the departure of Walker, next season will be the first time in National League history without a player-manager.
November 21 – Carl Stotz, principal founding father of the Little League, sues the organization for breach of contract. The suit will be settled out of court.
November 28 – The Chicago Cubs trade pitcher Hal Jeffcoat to the Cincinnati Redlegs in exchange for catcher Hobie Landrith.

December
December 8 – Lenny Yochim of the Leones del Caracas became the first pitcher to throw a no-hitter in the Venezuelan Professional Baseball League. The 27-year-old left-hander accomplished the feat in a 3–0 victory over the Navegantes del Magallanes helped by catcher Earl Battey. Ramón Monzant was credited with the loss. Previously, the screwballer Yochim had pitched for the Pittsburgh Pirates in part of two seasons.

Births

January
January   1 – LaMarr Hoyt
January   1 – Bob Owchinko
January   6 – Doe Boyland 
January   9 – Pat Rockett
January 11 – Dan Norman
January 12 – Chuck Porter
January 18 – Dave Geisel
January 21 – Dave Smith
January 21 – Mike Smithson
January 24 – Ted Cox
January 26 – Joe Pettini
January 28 – Joe Beckwith
January 31 – Ted Power

February
February   1 – Ernie Camacho
February   4 – Gary Allenson
February   4 – Rusty Kuntz
February   5 – Mike Heath
February   7 – Charlie Puleo
February   9 – John Urrea
February   9 – Jerry Keller
February 10 – Mike Champion
February 12 – Greg Johnston
February 12 – Gene Krug
February 12 – Chet Lemon
February 12 – Steve Mura

March
March   3 – Jim Wright
March   5 – Steve Burke
March   8 – Phil Nastu
March 11 – Larry Landreth
March 12 – Ruppert Jones
March 15 – Mickey Hatcher
March 18 – Dwayne Murphy
March 19 – Mike Norris
March 25 – Lee Mazzilli
March 26 – Dan Morogiello
March 29 – Karl Pagel

April
April   2 – Billy Sample
April   7 – Bobby Mitchell
April 14 – Chris Welsh
April 16 – Bruce Bochy
April 16 – Rick Jones
April 17 – Tom Runnells
April 18 – Bobby Castillo
April 19 – Mike Colbern
April 22 – David Clyde
April 23 – Tom Dixon
April 26 – Mike Scott
April 28 – Dewey Robinson

May
May 1 – Steve Lubratich
May 1 – Ray Searage
May 7 – Bob Ferris
May 12 – Ralph Botting
May 14 – Dennis Martínez
May 14 – Hosken Powell
May 16 – Jack Morris
May 16 – Tack Wilson
May 19 – Alan Knicely
May 19 – Ed Whitson
May 21 – Eddie Milner
May 25 – Suguru Egawa
May 25 – Andrés Mora
May 27 – Ross Baumgarten
May 31 – Larry Owen

June
June   1 – Sandy Wihtol
June   3 – Jim Gaudet
June   6 – Angel Moreno
June   6 – Chris Nyman
June 10 – Floyd Bannister
June 10 – Scott Ullger
June 13 – Bobby Clark
June 17 – Joe Charboneau
June 26 – Manny Seoane

July
July   3 – Matt Keough
July   3 – Jeff Rineer
July   7 – Len Barker
July   7 – Jerry Dybzinski
July   9 – Willie Wilson
July 13 – Kevin Bell
July 21 – Mark Lemongello
July 27 – Shane Rawley

August
August   2 – Jim Dorsey
August   6 – Ron Davis
August   6 – Steve Nicosia
August   6 – Jim Pankovits
August   7 – Steve Senteney
August 11 – Bryn Smith
August 13 – Odie Davis
August 18 – Bruce Benedict
August 19 – Terry Harper
August 19 – Silvio Martínez
August 22 – Larry Vanover
August 27 – Pat Kelly
August 29 – Phil Cuzzi
August 30 – Renie Martin

September
September 2 – Kazuhiro Yamakura
September 3 – Don Kainer
September 5 – Gil Patterson
September 13 – Mike Fischlin
September 16 – Joe Edelen
September 16 – Robin Yount
September 17 – Marshall Brant
September 18 – Don McCormack
September 18 – Ray Smith
September 22 – Jeffrey Leonard
September 24 – Gorman Heimueller
September 25 – Jim Wessinger
September 27 – Bob Veselic
September 28 – Terry Bogener
September 29 – Byron McLaughlin
September 30 – Carlos Lezcano

October
October   1 – Jeff Reardon
October   3 – Jim Joyce
October   4 – Gary Cederstrom
October   4 – Lary Sorensen
October   8 – Jerry Reed
October   9 – Alex Taveras
October 12 – Jim Lewis
October 14 – Jesús Vega
October 16 – Kurt Seibert
October 17 – Brian Snitker
October 21 – Jerry Garvin
October 25 – Tommy Boggs
October 25 – Danny Darwin
October 25 – Jeff Schattinger
October 29 – Darrell Brown

November
November   2 – Greg Harris
November   2 – Bob Tufts
November   3 – Mark Corey
November   5 – Bobby Ramos
November   7 – Guy Sularz
November   9 – Jeff Cox
November 10 – Jack Clark
November 11 – John Hobbs
November 15 – Fred Breining
November 15 – Randy Niemann
November 18 – Luis Pujols
November 21 – Rick Peters
November 22 – Kevin Rhomberg
November 22 – Wayne Tolleson
November 23 – Todd Cruz
November 23 – Mark Smith
November 23 – Dan Whitmer
November 24 – Rafael Santo Domingo
November 26 – Jay Howell
November 26 – Mike Mendoza
November 30 – Barry Evans

December
December   6 – Luis Rosado
December   7 – Scot Thompson
December 13 – Paul Boris
December 18 – Jim Clancy
December 19 – Kevin Stanfield
December 22 – Lonnie Smith
December 23 – Keith Comstock
December 27 – Gary Weiss
December 30 – Keith MacWhorter
December 31 – Jim Tracy

Deaths

January
January 13 – Bill Dinneen, 78, pitching star of the 1903 World Series, while winning three games for the champion Boston Americans against the Pittsburgh Pirates, including the first two shutouts in World Series history.
January 18 – Phil Morrison, 60, pitcher who worked two-thirds of an inning for the Pittsburgh Pirates, his lone major-league appearance, on September 30, 1921.
January 22 – Bob Wicker, 77, right-hander who pitched in 138 games for the St. Louis Cardinals, Chicago Cubs and Cincinnati Reds between 1901 and 1906; won 20 games for 1903 Cubs; also appeared in 26 games as an outfielder, and batted .205 lifetime.
January 23 – Elmer Brown, 71, southpaw hurler who worked in 43 games for St. Louis of the American League and Brooklyn of the National League between 1911 and 1915.
January 24 – Monte Beville, 79, catcher and first baseman for the New York Highlanders and Detroit Tigers in 1903–1904 who got into 145 career games.
January 25 – Harry Barton, 80, switch-hitting catcher-infielder who played in 29 games for the 1905 Philadelphia Athletics.
January 26 – Austin Walsh, 63, outfielder who appeared in 57 games for Chicago of the "outlaw" Federal League in 1914.
January 28 – Bill Calhoun, 64, who got into six games as a pinch hitter and first baseman for the 1913 Boston Braves.

February
February   3 – Fred Brown, 75, outfielder over parts of two seasons for the Boston Beaneaters in 1901 and 1902, and later a politician who served as Governor of New Hampshire and also in the United States Senate.
February   6 – Rosey Rowswell, 71, radio sportscaster best known for being the first full-time play-by-play announcer for the Pittsburgh Pirates, serving from 1936 until his death.
February   6 – Hank Thormahlen, 58, pitcher for the New York Yankees, Boston Red Sox and Brooklyn Robins between 1917 and 1925.
February 10 – Cuke Barrows, 71, outfielder who played from 1909 to 1912 for the Chicago White Sox.
February 10 – Ray Hartranft, 64, pitcher for the 1913 Philadelphia Phillies.
February 10 – Allie Strobel, 70, second baseman who saw action with the Boston Beaneaters in 1905 and 1906.
February 13 – Clyde Spearman, 42, one of five brothers to play in the Negro leagues; outfielder for five clubs between 1935 and 1946 and led 1938 Negro National League in hits while a member of the Philadelphia Stars.
February 15 – Lynn Nelson, 49, pitcher and pinch hitter in all or part of seven seasons between 1930 and 1940 for the Chicago Cubs, Philadelphia Athletics and Detroit Tigers; had a pedestrian mound record of 33–42 (5.25) in 166 games pitched, but batted .281 lifetime with 103 hits, including a .354 season with 1937 Athletics with 40 hits, four home runs and 29 runs batted in.
February 15 – Tom Tennant, 72, pinch-hitter who appeared in just two games for the St. Louis Browns in the 1912 season.
February 23 – Bill Tozer, 72, pitcher in four games for the 1908 Cincinnati Reds.
February 25 – Ike Kamp, 54, pitcher who played for the Boston Braves in 1924 and 1925.

March
March   4 – Doc Reisling, 80, "dead-ball era" pitcher who posted a 2.45 earned run average in 49 career games for the 1903–1904 Brooklyn Superbas and 1909–1910 Washington Senators.
March 10 – Rick Adams, 76, left-handed pitcher who worked in 11 games for the 1905 Senators.
March 13 – Buck Sweeney, 64, who appeared in one game (with one at bat) as a left fielder for the Philadelphia Athletics on September 28, 1914.
March 13 – Joe Vernon, 65, pitcher whose two-game career included one contest for the 1912 Chicago Cubs and one for the 1914 Brooklyn Tip-Tops of the "outlaw" Federal League.
March 16 – Red Booles, 74, left-hander who pitched in four games for the 1909 Cleveland Naps.
March 18 – Morrie Aderholt, 39, outfielder who appeared in 106 games over all or part of five seasons spanning 1939 to 1945 for the Washington Senators, Brooklyn Dodgers and Boston Braves; scout for Washington at the time of his death.
March 18 – Ty Helfrich, 64, second baseman who appeared in 43 games for the Federal League's Brooklyn Tip-Tops in 1915.
March 19 – Ed Hovlik, 63, who pitched in 11 games for the 1918–1919 Washington Senators.
March 19 – George Stultz, 81, pitcher who threw a complete-game victory, allowing no earned runs, in his only big-league appearance for the Boston Beaneaters of the National League on September 22, 1894.
March 27 – Frank Roth, 76, catcher who played in 282 games over six seasons between 1903 and 1910, principally the Philadelphia Phillies; later a coach. 
March 28 – Tom Lynch, 94, 19th-century outfielder-catcher who played in 42 games for Wilmington of the Union Association (1884) and Philadelphia of the National League (1884–1885).

April
April   2 – Reggie Grabowski, 47, pitcher for the 1932–1934 Philadelphia Phillies who worked in 51 career games.
April   8 – Alfred Saylor, 43, pitcher for the 1943–1945 Birmingham Black Barons who led the 1944 Negro American League in innings pitched and games lost.
April 10 – Curt Bernard, 77, who appeared in 43 games, mostly as an outfielder, for the 1900–1901 New York Giants.
April 16 – Louis Graff, 88, listed as appearing in one game as a catcher for the Syracuse Stars of the major-league American Association on June 23, 1890.
April 28 – Felix Chouinard, 67, outfielder-infielder who played 50 of his 88 career games in the Federal League (Brooklyn Tip-Tops, Pittsburgh Rebels, Baltimore Terrapins) in 1914–1915, after debuting with the Chicago White Sox in 1910–1911.

May
May   3 – Newt Randall, 75, Canadian outfielder who played in 97 games for Chicago and Boston of the National League in 1907.
May   4 – Fredrick Westervelt, 77, umpire who officiated in the American League (1911–1912), Federal League (1915), and National League (1922–1923). 
May 13 – Lefty George, 68, longtime minor-league pitcher (1909–1921, 1923–1933, 1940 and 1943–1944), where he won 327 career games, whose MLB tenure included 52 total games for the 1911 St. Louis Browns, 1912 Cleveland Naps, 1915 Cincinnati Reds, and 1918 Boston Braves.
May 18 – Harry Wood, 70, Maine native who appeared in two games as an 18-year-old outfielder for Cincinnati in April 1903.
May 24 – Bob Cone, 61, pitcher who appeared in two-thirds of an inning in his lone appearance with the last-place Philadelphia Athletics on July 25, 1915.
May 29 – Ray Brown, 66, Chicago Cubs' right-hander who threw a complete-game victory in his lone MLB game on September 29, 1909.
May 31 – Henry Jones, 98, 19th-century infielder-outfielder who played in 34 games for the 1884 Detroit Wolverines of the National League.

June
June   2 – Harry Eccles, 61, pitcher who played for the Philadelphia Athletics during the 1915 season.
June   6 – Mike Kelley, 79, first baseman for the 1899 Louisville Colonels; later a longtime minor league manager (notably with St. Paul and Minneapolis) and club owner (Minneapolis).
June 16 – Mike Morrison, 88, pitcher who played for the Cleveland Spiders, Syracuse Stars and Baltimore Orioles in part of three seasons between 1887 and 1890.
June 18 – Jack Katoll, 82, German pitcher who played for the Chicago Orphans, Chicago White Sox and Baltimore Orioles in a span of four seasons from 1898 to 1902.
June 19 – Eli Juran, 52, left-handed first baseman-outfielder-pitcher who appeared for five different clubs in the Eastern Colored League and East–West League in 1926 and 1932.
June 22 – Frankie Hayes, 40, five-time All-Star catcher who played for the Philadelphia Athletics, St. Louis Browns, Cleveland Indians, Chicago White Sox and Boston Red Sox for 14 seasons spanning 1933 to 1947; a workhorse who caught 312 consecutive games between October 1943 and April 1946, a Major League record, including catching all 155 Athletics games in 1944, setting a still-standing American League season record;  led AL three times in total chances per game, twice each in fielding average, putouts, double plays and errors, and once in assists; his 29 double plays in 1945 is the second-highest total ever for a catcher.
June 27 – Harry Agganis, 26, Boston Red Sox first baseman who appeared in 157 games between April 13, 1954 and June 2, 1955, when he was sidelined by illness; former Boston University football star who compiled outstanding records as a quarterback and became first person in BU history to receive All-American honors.
June 29 – Horace Milan, 61, outfielder who played in 42 games with the Washington Senators in 1915 and 1917; brother of speedster Clyde Milan.

July
July 12 – Dan McGeehan, 70, second baseman who played three games for the St. Louis Cardinals in April 1911.
July 12 – Jesse Stovall, 79, pitcher who hurled in 28 games for the 1903 Cleveland Naps and 1904 Detroit Tigers; also played six games as a first baseman and pinch hitter.
July 12 – Harry Taylor, 89, 19th-century first baseman and outfielder who played 438 games for the 1890–1892 Louisville Colonels and 1893 Baltimore Orioles.
July 20 – Joe Shannon, 58, who appeared in five contests as a pinch hitter, outfielder and first baseman for the 1915 Boston Braves at the age of 18.
July 22 – Lafayette Henion, 56, pitcher who made one appearance in MLB when he threw three innings of relief for the Brooklyn Robins on September 10, 1919.
July 28 – Rudy Baerwald (also known as Rudy Bell and Jack Bell), 74, outfielder in 18 games for 1907 New York Highlanders.
July 28 – Dell Clark, 64, second baseman for the 1921 St. Louis Giants of the Negro National League.
July 30 – Dave Rowan, 73, Canadian first baseman who appeared in 18 contests for the St. Louis Browns between May 27 and June 22, 1911.

August
August   2 – Peaches O'Neill, 75, Notre Dame graduate who appeared in eight contests as a catcher, first baseman and pinch hitter for the 1905 Cincinnati Reds.
August   3 – Mule Shirley, 54, first baseman who played 44 games for pennant-winning 1924 and 1925 Washington Senators; played in three games as pinch hitter or pinch runner in the 1924 World Series for champion Senators.
August   4 – Mike Balenti, 69, shortstop-outfielder who appeared in 78 total games for 1911 Cincinnati Reds and 1913 St. Louis Browns; a Native American (Cheyenne) who attended Carlisle Indian School.
August   5 – Norm Glockson, 61, catcher and pinch hitter who received a seven-game trial with Cincinnati late in the 1914 season.
August   5 – Wilbur Pritchett, 58, pitcher who hurled for five clubs over eight seasons in Black baseball between 1924 and 1932.
August   6 – Hooks Cotter, 55, first baseman for 1922 and 1924 Chicago Cubs, appearing in 99 career games
August 11 – Jerry Byrne, 48, pitcher in three games for the 1929 Chicago White Sox.
August 11 – Babe Ellison, 56, infielder-outfielder in 135 games for the 1916–1920 Detroit Tigers; enjoyed brilliant minor-league career with San Francisco Seals from 1921–1927, where in 1924 he compiled 307 hits in 201 Pacific Coast League games, seventh-most in history; member of PCL Hall of Fame.
August 23 – Eugene Redd, 55, third baseman-shortstop for the Cleveland Tate Stars and Milwaukee Bears of the Negro National League in 1922–1923.
August 24 – John Raleigh, 68, southpaw who went 1–10 (4.10 ERA) in 18 games for the 1909–1910 St. Louis Cardinals.
August 25 – Jimmy Hudgens, 53, pinch hitter/first baseman who played in 26 career games for the 1923 St. Louis Cardinals and 1925–1926 Cincinnati Reds.
August 26 – Sol White, 87, pioneer player, manager and executive of the Negro leagues (1887 to 1926) and member of the National Baseball Hall of Fame (elected 2006); piloted Philadelphia Giants to four consecutive championships (1904–1907) and in the latter year wrote the first history of Black baseball.

September
September   1 – Jim Oglesby, 50, first baseman and minor-league veteran who appeared in three games at age 30 for the 1936 Philadelphia Athletics.
September   3 – Hal Schwenk, 65, southpaw who, in his only MLB game, pitched his St. Louis Browns to an 11-inning, 5–4 complete game victory on September 4, 1913.
September   4 – Gus Weyhing, 88, fire-balling  hurler who won 264 games (losing 232) for 11 teams in four major leagues (National, American, Players', and the American Association) between 1887 and 1901, and set the all-time record for hit batsmen (277); won 30 or more games for four consecutive seasons (1889–1892), and 20 or more games on three other occasions; also lost 19 or more games eight times. 
September   8 – Dode Criss, 70, good-hitting pitcher turned pinch hitter and first baseman who played in 227 games for 1908–1911 St. Louis Browns; batted .276 lifetime with 84 hits and posted 3–9 record (4.38 ERA) in 30 mound appearances.
September 10 – Shano Collins, 69, outfielder/first baseman who appeared in 1,799 games for the Chicago White Sox (1910–1920) and Boston Red Sox (1921–1925); member of 1917 World Series champions; manager of Red Sox, 1931 to June 18, 1932.
September 12 – Dick Adkins, 35, shortstop who played three games for the Philadelphia Athletics in September 1942. 
September 16 – George Brown, 69, outfielder for Dayton, Columbus and Detroit of the Negro National League in 1920 and 1921; prior to that, played extensively for independent Black baseball clubs during the 1910s.
September 16 – Dan Sherman, 64, pitcher who faced four batters (and registered one out) in his only appearance for Chicago of the Federal League on September 4, 1914. 
September 20 – Art Herman, 84, pitcher who appeared in 17 games for Louisville of the National League in 1896 and 1897.
September 22 – Louis Drucke, 66, New York Giants' pitcher who worked in 53 games between 1909 and 1912; member of 1911 NL champions.
September 23 – McKinley Brewer, 59, pitcher-outfielder-first baseman for the 1921 Chicago Giants of the Negro National League.
September 23 – Gary Fortune, 60, pitcher who went 0–5 lifetime (6.61 ERA) in 20 games for the Philadelphia Phillies (1916, 1918) and Boston Red Sox (1920).
September 27 – Fred Walden, 65, catcher who played in one game, caught one inning, and made one error, in his one MLB game on June 3, 1912, as a member of the St. Louis Browns.

October
October   4 – Stan Baumgartner, 60, relief pitcher who spent eight seasons in the majors with both of Philadelphia's MLB teams, the Phillies and Athletics, between 1914 and 1926, then became a prominent baseball writer in that city. 
October   5 – Lyman Lamb, 60, third baseman for the St. Louis Browns during two seasons from 1920 to 1921.
October   9 – Howie Fox, 34, pitcher for the Cincinnati Reds, Philadelphia Phillies and Baltimore Orioles from 1944 to 1954.
October   9 – Jim Jackson, 77, utility outfielder who played for the Baltimore Orioles, New York Giants and Cleveland Naps over four seasons from 1901 to 1906.
October 13 – Fred Lear, 61, third baseman who played for the Philadelphia Athletics, Chicago Cubs and New York Giants in part of four seasons between 1915 and 1920.
October 18 – George Murray, 57, who pitched from 1922 to 1933 for the New York Yankees, Boston Red Sox, Washington Senators and Chicago White Sox.
October 18 – Charlie Shields, 32, pitcher who played for the Chicago American Giants, New York Cubans and Homestead Grays of the Negro leagues between 1941 and 1943.
October 26 – Jack Bushelman, 70, pitcher who played with the Cincinnati Reds in the 1909 season and for the Boston Red Sox from 1911 to 1912.
October 27 – Clark Griffith, 85, Hall of Fame pitcher and manager, and principal owner of the Washington Senators since 1920; won 237 games in 20-year career in three major leagues between 1891 and 1914, with 20 or more victories in seven different campaigns; led National League in earned run average (1.88) in 1898, then was a key recruiter of NL players to upstart American League in 1901; managed Chicago White Stockings, New York Highlanders, Cincinnati Reds and Senators between 1901 and 1920; his 1901 White Stockings won the pennant in the AL's inaugural season.

November
November   3 – John Merritt, 61, backup outfielder who appeared in just one game with the New York Giants in the 1913 season.
November   4 – Cy Young, 88, Hall of Fame pitcher who won a record 511 games over a 22-year career with five clubs from 1890 to 1911, being a 30-game winner five seasons, a 20-game victor sixteen times, pitching a perfect game, two no-hitters, and while being a member of the 1903 Boston Americans hurling the first pitch in a World Series game.
November   5 – Frank Gregory, 67, pitcher for the Cincinnati Reds in their 1912 season.
November   5 – Bert Wilson, 44, Chicago-based sportscaster who was the radio voice of the Cubs from 1943 to 1955.
November 12 – Sam Crane, 61, shortstop who played for the Philadelphia Athletics, Washington Senators, Cincinnati Reds and Brooklyn Robins in part of seven seasons spanning 1914–1922.
November 15 – Calvin Clarke, 39, outfielder, second baseman and pitcher who appeared for the 1938 Washington Black Senators and 1941 Newark Eagles of the Negro National League.
November 19 – Otto Jacobs, 66, catcher for the 1918 Chicago White Sox.
November 23 – Fred Tauby, 49, part-time outfielder who played with the Chicago White Sox in the 1935 season and for the Philadelphia Phillies in 1937. 
November 30 – John Stone, 50, outfielder for the Detroit Tigers and Washington Senators from 1928 to 1938, who hit over .300 in seven of his eleven seasons, with a career-high .341 in 1936.

December
December   6 – Honus Wagner, 81, legendary Hall of Fame shortstop of the Pittsburgh Pirates who won eight National League batting crowns and led the league in runs batted in, stolen bases, doubles and slugging average at least five times each in a 21-year career, posting an overall batting line of .328/.391/.467, having scored 1,739 runs, connect 3,420 hits and stolen 723 bases.
December   8 – Buck Washer, 73, pitcher for the Philadelphia Phillies during the 1905 season.
December   9 – Curt Walker, 59, right fielder who played twelve seasons from 1919 to 1930 for the Philadelphia Phillies, New York Yankees, Cincinnati Reds and New York Giants, compiling a slash line of.304/.374/.440 and 1,475 hits in 1,359 games, while batting a .300 or better average in seven seasons.
December 17 – Rube DeGroff, 76, backup outfielder for the St. Louis Cardinals during two seasons from 1905 to 1906.
December 18 – George Caster, 48, pitcher who played for the Philadelphia Athletics, St. Louis Browns and Detroit Tigers during twelve seasons from 1934 to 1946, as well as a member of the 1945 World Champion Tigers.
December 18 – Francisco José Cróquer, 35, Venezuelan sportscaster specialized in baseball and boxing, who achieved international renown and became a household name in Latino communities after joining the Gillette Cavalcade of Sports in the late 1940s.
December 19 – Moxie Divis, 61, outfielder who played for the Philadelphia Athletics during the 1916 season.
December 22 – Jimmy O'Rourke, 71, outfielder who played in 1908 with the New York Highlanders. 
December 23 – Joe McManus, 68, who pitched in 1913 for the Cincinnati Reds.
December 24 – Jake Boultes, 71, who played from 1907 through 1909 for the Boston Doves, mostly as a pitcher, although he also played a handful of games as a shortstop and third baseman.
December 27 – Lord Byron, 83, National League umpire from 1913 to 1919, while officiating 1,012 games and the 1914 World Series.
December 27 – Jim Fairbank, 74, pitcher who played for the Philadelphia Athletics during the 1903 and 1904 seasons.
December 31 – Clint Brown, 52, relief pitcher for the Cleveland Indians and Chicago White Sox in a span of fifteen seasons from 1928 to 1942, who posted a career 89-93 W-L record with 64 saves and 4.26 ERA, leading the American League relievers in 1939 in appearances (61), games finished (56), saves (18) and innings, ending 11th in the voting for the American League MVP Award.

Sources

External links

Baseball Almanac - Major League Baseball Players Who Were Born in 1955
Baseball Almanac - Major League Baseball Players Who Died in 1955
Baseball Reference - 1955 MLB Season Summary 
ESPN - 1955 MLB Season History